KRET-TV, UHF analog channel 23, was an educational television station licensed to Richardson, Texas, United States, which was on the air from 1960 to 1970. Owned by the Richardson Independent School District, it was the first broadcast TV station in the nation to be wholly owned by a school district. The call letters "RET" stood for "Richardson Educational Television".

History

It was actually the first educational television station in the Dallas–Fort Worth area, signing on about six months before KERA-TV.

The studio was first located at Richardson Junior High School from 1960 to 1963, then at Richardson High School from 1963 to 1970. The station was converted on August 31, 1970 into a closed-circuit network named "TAGER".

The tower stood on the campus of Richardson High School before being taken down in the mid-2000s, to make room for expansion of the school building.

Channel 23 was later reallocated to nearby Garland. The frequency remained dark until 1985 when religious broadcaster KIAB-TV signed on the air. The station was later sold to Univision and became KUVN-TV, the network's O&O for North Texas.

Station personnel
The 1969-1970 Television Factbook/Stations volume listed the following station personnel for KRET-TV:

 Lloyd J. Collins, Station Manager
 Richard F. Hays, Director Of Programming
 Bob Ramsey, Chief Engineer
 Jay Garrett (Marcom) Audio Tech

References

Shannon, Mike. DFW TV STATIONS. ''The History of Dallas-Fort Worth Radio and Television.
 Initial KRET broadcast date
1969-1970 Television Factbook/Stations Volume

Television stations in the Dallas–Fort Worth metroplex
Television channels and stations established in 1960
1960 establishments in Texas
Television channels and stations disestablished in 1970
1970 disestablishments in Texas
Defunct television stations in the United States
Educational and instructional television channels
RET-TV